Orbost Railway Station was located in Orbost, Victoria and was the terminus of the Orbost railway line. To save on the costs of a bridge over the Snowy River, which had highly variable levels, the station was located on the west side of the river, even though the town of Orbost was on the east side.

History
Orbost Railway Station was opened on Monday 10 April 1916, and closed on 24 August 1987. Little evidence remains of the station itself, other than bits of the concrete face of the passenger platform.

Bridges
Part of the former line were the Snowy River Floodplain Railway Bridges, two lengthy low-level bridges forming part of a causeway over the river flats, leading towards the station site. One bridge is 770 metres long and the other 183 metres long, and comprise a series of timber and steel trestles.

External links
Orbost station Vicsig

References

Disused railway stations in Victoria (Australia)
Railway stations in Australia opened in 1916
Railway stations closed in 1987
Transport in Gippsland (region)
Shire of East Gippsland